Adanna Steinacker (née Ohakim, 2 March 1988) is a medical doctor, entrepreneur, public speaker, and a strong advocate for women's empowerment Her purpose-driven brand "House of Adanna", a creative community platform that empowers women, produces engaging content around the topics of health, well-being, sustainability, motherhood, and equality, including Sustainable Development Goals SDG 5 and SDG 3. House of Adanna's online community counts over 1 million people combined. Adanna is married to her university sweetheart David Steinacker, a German business consultant, and they have three children together.

Personal life and education 
Adanna Steinacker, from Imo State, Nigeria, was born on 2 March 1988. She is one of five children of Igbo businessman, politician and former governor of Imo State Ikedi Ohakim and barrister Chioma Ohakim. She attended high school in Nigeria before gaining a BSc in Biomedicine from the University of East Anglia in the UK in 2010, and medical degrees (MB, Bch, BAO, LRCP and SI) from The Royal College of Surgeons in Ireland (RCSI) in 2015. In 2018, she earned a Certificate of Entrepreneurship from Harvard Business School.

While at university, she met German native David Steinacker, a fellow student who began working as a business consultant in the technology sector in 2012. A few years into their relationship, the couple celebrated three wedding ceremonies, a traditional Igbo Igbankwu in Nigeria in December 2013, a German court wedding in March 2014, and a church ceremony in Dublin, Ireland, in July 2014. Videos of their wedding went viral and have amassed over 2.8 million views. They have three children, two sons and a daughter.

Work 
In October 2017, Steinacker founded and became the CEO of Medics Abroad, an international organisation providing logistics for clinical placements in Africa to medics around the world. Medics Abroad offered on-site rotations in Kenya, Ghana, Rwanda and South Africa, with plans to expand across the entire continent. In 2020, Medics Abroad was affected by the pandemic, just a year after transitioning fully from clinical practice to entrepreneurship.

Steinacker is a Digital influencer. She first gained international notability when a 15-second Instagram video of herself and her husband, dancing to Afrobeats music in their kitchen, went viral in 2014. In 2018, Steinacker and her husband were featured in the BBC Newsbeat documentary YouTube Couples: How to stay in love.

She has been featured as the keynote speaker at various international conferences, including the World Economic Forum (WEF)'s Annual Meeting, United Nations Climate Change conference, and the Goalkeepers Initiative by the Bill & Melinda Gates Foundation, focusing on women's empowerment, particularly around health, sustainability, equality, and SDG 3.

Advocacy 
A black African woman, Steinacker identifies as a feminist.

References

External links

Living people
Lifestyle YouTubers
Nigerian YouTubers
Nigerian expatriates in Germany
Nigerian women medical doctors
21st-century Nigerian women
21st-century Nigerian medical doctors
21st-century Nigerian businesspeople
Nigerian women business executives
Igbo businesspeople
Igbo physicians
Igbo female models
Alumni of the University of East Anglia
People from Imo State
Alumni of the Royal College of Surgeons in Ireland
Nigerian feminists
Year of birth missing (living people)